Jesaia Swart (born 3 July 1938), commonly known as Sjaak Swart, is a Dutch former professional footballer who played as a winger for Ajax. During his career at Ajax, he amassed a total of almost 600 matches, a record for the club.

Biography
Swart is Jewish and was born in Muiderberg, a fishing village about 20 kilometers east of Amsterdam. His Jewish fisherman father sold herring at the market. As a child, he and his father concealed themselves as non-Jews during the Nazi occupation of the Netherlands from 1940 to 1945, hiding from Germans and Dutch colluders, who rounded up any Jews; nearly 75 per cent of the Dutch Jewish population was killed in those years.

Nicknamed Mr. Ajax, he played for Ajax a total of almost 600 matches, a record for the club, starting in 1956. He was part of their European Cup victories in 1971, 1972, 1973.

For the Netherlands national team, Swart earned 31 caps, scoring ten goals.

Career statistics

Honours
Ajax
Eredivisie (7): 1959–60, 1965–66, 1966–67, 1967–68, 1969–70, 1971–72, 1972–73
KNVB Cup: 1960–61, 1966–67, 1969–70, 1970–71, 1971–72
European Cup: 1970–71, 1971–72, 1972–73
Intertoto Cup: 1962
European Supercup: 1972, 1973
Intercontinental Cup: 1972

See also
List of Jewish footballers
List of select Jewish association football players

References

1938 births
Living people
Footballers from Amsterdam
Association football wingers
Dutch footballers
Jewish footballers
Dutch sports agents
Association football agents
Dutch Jews
Netherlands international footballers
Jewish Dutch sportspeople
Eredivisie players
AFC Ajax players
UEFA Champions League winning players